The Edgewater in Madison, Wisconsin is a hotel which opened in 1948.  It was listed on the National Register of Historic Places in 1997 as part of the Mansion Hill Historic District.

It has been stated to be a "superb" example of Art Moderne architecture designed by Kenosha architect Lawrence Monberg.  Its NRHP nomination states:
There are five Art Moderne buildings in the Mansion Hill district.
In Wisconsin, Art Moderne was built between 1930 and 1950. Inspired by advances in technology and industrialization, Art
Moderne has a horizonal, stream-lined appearance. This look is achieved through the use of smooth wall finishes, flat roofs,
curving walls and horizontal bands of windows. Three of the Art Moderne buildings in Mansion Hill are superb examples of the style.
All three were designed by Lawrence Monberg, then living in Kenosha. The Quisling Towers Apartments at 1 East Oilman Street (1937, NRHP) is veneered with buff brick and displays horizontal bands of windows at the corners, surmounted by long, narrow canopies. The upper floors have curving walls with a sculptural quality. The Quisling Clinic at 2 West Gorham Street (1945)
features curving walls with parapets, horizontal bands of windows with long, narrow canopies, round windows and a canopy over the
east corner entrance that curves downward, sweeping to the ground. The horizontal lines of the Edgewater Apartments and Hotel at 642 Wisconsin Avenue (1946) are emphasized with bands of windows with continuous sills and lintels at each floor, corner windows, and parapets at the tops of the walls.

It is located on the shore of Lake Mendota, near the University of Wisconsin-Madison and the Wisconsin State Capitol.

It was listed as a Historic Hotels of America by the National Trust for Historic Preservation in 2015.

It was designed by architect Lawrence Monberg.  It is a contributing building in the Mansion Hill Historic District, which covers part of the Mansion Hill neighborhood, an upper class area in the 1800s of Madison, Wisconsin.

Gould described it as:a last gasp of the Streamline Moderne style, which celebrated the sleek profiles and aerodynamic shapes of luxury liners, locomotives and other symbols of the machine age. / With its portholes, wraparound windows, curved portico and buff brick, the Edgewater (it became a hotel in 1950) is all of a piece with two other Monberg buildings nearby: the Quisling Terrace apartments (formerly the Quisling Clinic), at 2 W. Gorham St., and the Quisling Towers apartment building, 1 E. Gilman St. / Alas, a 1973 addition to the hotel - a graceless horizontal slab - was an insult, cheapening the original. / The latest proposed expansion, designed by the Boston firm of Elkus Manfredi for the Hammes Co., is not in that dismal rank, thank goodness, but it's far from inspired. Rather, it's timid and nostalgic. Surely these otherwise talented architects, and Madison, can do better. / The $109 million project envisions a landscaped public plaza atop the '70s addition, with a staircase down to the lake, and an 11-story tower at the east end of the property. The old Edgewater would be restored. / Three cheers for the restoration. But so far the design for the plaza looks generic; the architects say it is undergoing revisions. One can only hope the result will be greener and more inventive. Imagine what a world-class landscape architect like Kathryn Gustafson, who designed the lush, evocative Lurie Garden at Chicago's Millennium Park, could do with such a space."

In 2010, it was slated for a $98 million redevelopment. The City of Madison was to contribute $16 million to the renovation.

It reopened in September 2014.

References

Hotels in Wisconsin
Historic Hotels of America
Buildings and structures in Madison, Wisconsin
Art Moderne architecture
Buildings and structures completed in 1946